A torc is a large rigid or stiff neck ring in metal, made either as a single piece or from strands twisted together.

Torc or TORC may also refer to:

Torc Robotics, a robotics company in southwestern Virginia
Torque, physical quantity
Truth or Consequences, New Mexico, a town
TORC: The Off Road Championship, an American off-road racing series
Torc Waterfall and Torc Mountain, both near Killarney, Ireland.

See also
Tork (disambiguation)
Torque (disambiguation)